André Støylen (born 9 April 1968) is a Norwegian politician for the Conservative Party.

Born in Ørsta, he served in the position of deputy representative to the Norwegian Parliament from Møre og Romsdal during the term 1989–1993. From 1994 to 1996 he was the leader of the Young Conservatives (Unge Høyre), the youth wing of the Conservative Party.

When the Conservative Party entered the cabinet in 2001, Støylen was appointed State Secretary in the Ministry of the Environment. In 2002 he became City Commissioner (byråd) of Finance in the city government of Oslo, leaving in 2007.

In 2008 he was appointed to the board of the National Gallery of Norway. In 2014 he was hired as the new chief executive of the foundation Sparebankstiftelsen DnB.

References

1968 births
Living people
Deputy members of the Storting
Norwegian state secretaries
Conservative Party (Norway) politicians
Politicians from Oslo
People from Ørsta
Norwegian businesspeople
BI Norwegian Business School alumni